Grasstree Beach is a coastal locality in the Mackay Region, Queensland, Australia. It contains two towns, Grasstree in the centre of the locality and Zelma on the coast.

History 
The town of Grasstree first appears on an 1891 survey plan. Grass Tree Provisional School opened circa 1892 and closed in 1899. It reopened in 1901 and closed  permanently in 1905 due to low student numbers.

The town of Zelma first appears on a 1935 survey plan.

The locality was named and bounded on 4 June 1999.

Geography
The waters and inlets of the Coral Sea form the eastern boundary and part of the southern.

References

External links 
 
Town map of Grasstree, 1974
Town map of Zelma, 1984

Mackay Region
Coastline of Queensland
Localities in Queensland